Mitotic spindle assembly checkpoint protein MAD1 is a protein that in humans is encoded by the MAD1L1 gene.

MAD1L1 is also known as Human Accelerated Region 3.  It may have played a key role in the evolution of humans from apes.

Function 

MAD1L1 is a component of the mitotic spindle-assembly checkpoint that prevents the onset of anaphase until all chromosome are properly aligned at the metaphase plate. MAD1L1 functions as a homodimer and interacts with MAD2L1. MAD1L1 may play a role in cell cycle control and tumor suppression. Three transcript variants encoding the same protein have been found for this gene.

Interactions 

MAD1L1 has been shown to interact with:
 HDAC1, 
 Histone deacetylase 2, and
 MAD2L1,

See also 
 MAD1
 MAD2
 Hyperphosphorylation

References